Sukhobuzimsky District is an administrative and municipal district (raion), one of the forty-three in Krasnoyarsk Krai, Russia. It is located in the south of the krai. Its administrative center is the rural locality (a selo) of Sukhobuzimskoye. Population:  The population of Sukhobuzimskoye accounts for 21.2% of the district's total population.

History
The district was founded on April 4, 1924.

Government
As of 2013, the Head of the district and the Chairman of the District Council is Viktor P. Vlisko.

References

Notes

Sources 

Districts of Krasnoyarsk Krai
States and territories established in 1924